The 11th Canadian Screen Awards are slated to take place on April 16, 2023 to honour achievements in Canadian film, television and digital media production in 2022. The television broadcast on April 16 will be a prerecorded special hosted by Samantha Bee, featuring the presentation of top categories; as in prior years, most awards will be presented in a series of Canadian Screen Week presentations over the week prior to the main ceremony, with some highlights included in the main broadcast. However, the decision to present the awards in a pretaped special rather than a live gala has drawn some criticism from several actors and filmmakers.

Nominees were announced on February 22, 2023.

Special awards
Recipients of the Academy's special awards were announced on January 18, 2023.
Board of Directors Tribute - Paul Pope, Jennifer Podemski
Academy Icon - Catherine O'Hara
Changemaker Award - Tracy Moore
Earle Grey Award - Peter MacNeill
Gordon Sinclair Award - Lisa LaFlamme
Humanitarian Award - Ryan Reynolds
Lifetime Achievement Award - Pierre Bruneau
Radius Award - Simu Liu

Category changes
In August 2022, the Academy announced that it will discontinue its past practice of presenting gendered awards for film and television actors and actresses; beginning in 2023, gender-neutral awards for Best Performance will be presented, with eight nominees per category instead of five. Some of the other acting categories, notably those for guest performance, youth performance in children's programming, television films and web series performance were already gender-neutral.

Other changes will include the introduction of new categories for Best Original Music in a Documentary, Best Original Song in Television, Best Picture Editing - Children's or Youth and Best Writing - Pre-School, the splitting of television music and sound categories from a simple fiction/non-fiction distinction into several new categories for particular genres of fiction and non-fiction programming, and the introduction of a revised jury process for the John Dunning Best First Feature Award.

Film

Television

Programs

Actors

News and information

Sports

Craft awards

Photography

Editing

Sound

Directing

Music

Writing

All-platform awards
One major category is currently presented without regard to the distinction between film, television or web media content.

Digital media

References

External links
Canadian Screen Awards

11
2022 film awards
2022 television awards
2023 in Ontario
2022 awards in Canada